John Carlucci is a Los Angeles based musician. He originally hailed from Queens, NYC, and played bass for power pop band The Speedies.

Nearly thirty years after The Speedies broke up, their rare and obscure 45, Let Me Take Your Photo, was used by Hewlett Packard in a nationwide television commercial. Exposure from the commercial led to the song being featured regularly on the Jay Leno show as a musical lead-in to his "photobooth" skit and to the release of a long lost Speedies LP on Radio Heartbeat Records.

After moving to Los Angeles, Carlucci joined the Fuzztones and was with them when they signed to RCA Records and recorded the In Heat record. He toured with the group in Europe in the late 1980s.

He is still active in music and has recorded or performed with artists including Sylvain Sylvain, Clem Burke & Frankie Infante, Ian Astbury, Lemmy, Dave Vanian, The Ghastly Ones, The Beat Killers, The Hexxers, Rik L Rik, Deke Dickerson, The Sprauge Bros., Dawn Shipley, Truly Lover Trio, Nikki Corvette, The Odd Squad, Kiss Kiss Bang Bang, Palmyra Delran & Bubble Gun, and The Mighty Manfred.

References

Living people
American rock bass guitarists
Year of birth missing (living people)
People from Queens, New York
Guitarists from Los Angeles
Guitarists from New York City
American male bass guitarists